Aerotitan is a genus of large azhdarchid pterosaur known from the Late Cretaceous period (Maastrichtian stage) of what is now the Allen Formation of the Neuquén Basin in northern Patagonia, Argentina.

Discovery and naming 
The type species Aerotitan sudamericanus was named and described in 2012 by Fernando Novas, Martin Kundrat, Federico Agnolín, Martin Ezcurra, Per Erik Ahlberg, Marcelo Isasi, Alberto Arriagada and Pablo Chafrat. The generic name is derived from Greek ἀήρ, aer, "air", and Titan, in reference to the fact the species represents a large flying reptile. The specific name refers to its provenance from South America.

The holotype, MPCN-PV 0054, has been recovered near the Bajo de Arriagada site, in Patagonia, from a layer of the upper Allen Formation. This snout is elongated and transversely compressed and the jaws are toothless. The wingspan has been estimated as at least .

In 2021, a study concluded that the specimen represented, not the upper jaws but the lower jaws.

Taxonomy 
Aerotitan has been assigned to the Azhdarchidae. If correct, this would make it the first unambiguous azhdarchid from South America. A study published by Nicholas Longrich and colleagues in 2018 classified the genus as a thalassodromid, sister taxon to Alanqa (a pterosaur also assigned as an azhdarchid), however, such assignment is not well-supported. The cladogram of their analysis is presented below:

Conversely, a 2021 study by Rodrigo Pêgas and colleagues noted dissimilarities between it and thalassodromines and supported an azhdarchid identity.

The cladogram below shows the placement of Aerotitan within Azhdarchiformes according to Andres and colleagues, 2021:

See also 
 Timeline of pterosaur research

References 

Azhdarchids
Maastrichtian life
Late Cretaceous pterosaurs of South America
Cretaceous Argentina
Fossils of Argentina
Allen Formation
Fossil taxa described in 2012
Taxa named by Fernando Novas